Mr Sherick's Shakes is a brand of milkshake sold mainly in the United Kingdom. Manufactured by Mr Shericks Ltd, it was first launched into the British retail market in 2013 in five varieties, each consisting of a flavoured milkshake base mixed with small pieces of food inclusions.

Flavours

The brand is currently produced in six flavours.

The range is stocked by premium retailers including Selfridges, Harrods, Waitrose, Booths and Moto.

Mr Sherick
The brand is eponymously named after its creator Andrew Sherick - a former Marks & Spencer Senior Buyer and ex-Chairman of the British Sandwich Association. In his Buying capacity at Marks & Spencer, Sherick spent years working in milkshake market analytics and had become aware of a gap at the premium end of the market for a highly indulgent milkshake brand. After working with artisan chefs for over four years to develop a range of milkshakes he felt were good enough to fill the market gap he had perceived, he resigned from his 22-year-long employment in 2013 to embark on an entrepreneurial journey to bring his own milkshake brand to market.

References

External links
Official Website
Official Twitter Page

British companies established in 2013
British drink brands
Drink companies of England
Food and drink companies established in 2013